Rousseau Lefevre De Poorter (born 1 October 2001) is a professional footballer who plays as a defender for Spanish Tercera División – Group 9 club Juventud Torremolinos on loan from Deinze. Born in Haiti, he has represented Belgium at youth international level.

Club career
De Poorter is a former youth academy player of Cercle Brugge, Lokeren and Anderlecht. In June 2019, Anderlecht announced that he would join U21 team of Zulte Waregem. He made his professional debut for the club on 7 August 2021 in a 3–1 league win against Sint-Truiden.

In May 2022, De Poorter signed a two-year contract with Deinze.

International career
De Poorter is a former Belgian youth international. He has played friendlies for Belgium under-16 and under-17 national teams.

In June 2021, Haiti national team coach Jean-Jacques Pierre named De Poorter in preliminary squad for 2021 CONCACAF Gold Cup.

Personal life
Born in Haiti, De Poorter was adopted by a Belgian family and moved to Belgium when he was three months old.

Career statistics

Club

References

External links
 

2001 births
Living people
Belgian footballers
Belgium youth international footballers
Haitian footballers
Belgian people of Haitian descent
Association football midfielders
Belgian Pro League players
S.V. Zulte Waregem players
K.M.S.K. Deinze players